The Landesliga Bremen is the sixth tier of the German football league system and the second-highest league in the German state of Bremen, below the Bremen-Liga.

Overview
The Landesliga Bremen is the second-highest level of play in Bremen. Traditionally, the league is set below the Verbandsliga Bremen. With the Oberliga Nord being dissolved in 2008, the Verbandsliga was renamed Bremen-Liga. This however did not change anything in regards of the Landesliga.

Of the German tier-six leagues, the Landesliga Bremen, like its association, the Bremen FA, is unique as it covers the smallest region and has no league parallel to itself, being the only league at this level in the state.

The league champion, together with the runners-up, is directly promoted to the Oberliga.

Below it sits the tier-seven league, the: Bezirksliga Bremen.

Recent winners of the Landesliga Bremen

References

Sources
 Deutschlands Fußball in Zahlen,  An annual publication with tables and results from the Bundesliga to Verbandsliga/Landesliga. DSFS.
 Kicker Almanach,  The yearbook on German football from Bundesliga to Oberliga, since 1937. Kicker Sports Magazine.
 Die Deutsche Liga-Chronik 1945-2005  History of German football from 1945 to 2005 in tables. DSFS. 2006.

External links
 Das deutsche Fussball Archiv  Historic German league tables
 The Bremen Football Association (BFV) 

Bre
Football competitions in Bremen (state)